Porta dos Fundos (literally "Back Door") is a Brazilian comedy YouTube channel. It was established in 2012 by Fábio Porchat, Antonio Pedro Tabet, Gregório Duvivier, João Vicente de Castro and Ian SBF in Rio de Janeiro. Its videos often feature closed captions in English.

Overview
Porta dos Fundos releases sketches depicting social situations in a satirically exaggerated manner. The parodies have been made on numerous themes, including religion, drug use, relationships, sexuality (as in its series Viral), political corruption and everyday frustrations. There are also parodies of history and fiction. The channel has sparked some controversy; Porchat said it occupied a blank space "that Brazilian television's conservative nature and obsession with [viewing] figures have missed."

The group refused several offers to bring it to television because "freedom is essential for us," stated Porchat. In 2014, however, Porta dos Fundos signed to Fox Network Brazil; the show premiered on Fox on 14 October 2014, and only exhibits sketches that are already on their YouTube channel. A theater film titled Contrato Vitalício was released in Brazil on 30 June 2016.

They became the first Brazilian YouTube channel to reach 10 million subscribers. Porta dos Fundos made cameo appearances in YouTube Rewind 2013 and 2015.

Crew

Cast

 Antonio Pedro Tabet
 Fábio Porchat
 Gregório Duvivier
 João Vicente de Castro
 Luis Lobianco
 Gabriel Totoro
 Thati Lopes
 Rafael Portugal
 Karina Ramil
 Evelyn Castro 
 Pedro Benevides
 Camillo Borges
 Macla Tenório

Former

 Marcos Veras (2012–14)
 Marcus Majella (2012–14)
 Letícia Lima (2012–15)
 Clarice Falcão (2012–15)
 Júlia Rabello (2012–15)
 Rafael Infante (2012–16)

Staff

 Ian SBF – screenwriter, director
 Rodrigo Magal – editor, director
 Gregório Duvivier – screenwriter
 Fábio Porchat – screenwriter
 Antonio Pedro Tabet – screenwriter
 Gabriel Esteves – screenwriter
 Luanne Araujo – editor
 Gustavo Chagas – making of director
 Alice Ventura – assistant director
 Gui Machado – cinematography
 Nataly Mega – production director
 Bianca Caetano – producer
 Ohana Boy – producer
 Lívia Andrade - producer
 Bruno Menezes – audio
 João Marcos – social media
 Juli Videla – costume designer
 Luciano Iulianelli – financial analyst
 Amanda Moura – commercial director
 Marcela Briones – commercial analyst
 Arthur Santiago – graphic designer

Filmography

Films

Series

Attack on headquarters
On December 26, 2019, it was reported that the headquarters of Porta dos Fundos, which is located in Rio de Janeiro, suffered from a Molotov cocktail bombing. A Brazilian Integralist religious group which dubbed themselves the "Popular Nationalist Insurgency Command of the Large Brazilian Integralist Family" claimed responsibility for the attack, even filming themselves attacking offices while wearing ski masks. The group, which attacked the headquarters on December 24, 2019, also criticized Netflix and labeled The First Temptation of Christ as blasphemous. One of the attackers was identified as Eduardo Fauzi Cerquise, who later took a flight to Russia and was put on the Interpol wanted list.

References

External links 

2012 establishments in Brazil
Brazilian comedy troupes
YouTube channels launched in 2012
Paramount International Networks
Paramount Global subsidiaries